The Journal of Luminescence is a monthly peer-reviewed scientific journal published by Elsevier. The editor-in-chief is Xueyuan Chen. According to the Journal Citation Reports, the journal has a 2021 impact factor of 4.171, ranking it 26th out of 101 journals in the category "Optics". The journal covers all aspects related to the emission of light (luminescence).

Editors
The editors-in-chief are:
S. Tanabe (Kyoto University
D. Poelman (Universiteit Gent, Ghent, Belgium.
K.-L. Wong (Hong Kong Baptist University
M.F. Reid (Dodd-Walls Centre for Photonic and Quantum Technologies)

References

External links

Elsevier academic journals
Optics journals
Publications established in 1968
Monthly journals
English-language journals